The Art of Being Straight is a 2008 film by Jesse Rosen on Malvern Productions. He also wrote the screenplay and plays the lead role of Jon. The film explores Jon's unexpected search for identity. The film was an official selection at the 2008 Frameline Film Festival and the Philadelphia International Gay & Lesbian Film Festival.

Plot

Jon, an aspiring photographer, breaks up with his girlfriend, and moves west to Los Angeles for a new start. He thinks he's got it all figured out. He's young, good looking and has always had a way with the ladies. He meets old acquaintances, Andy and Maddie. Then he gets introduced to Maddie's girlfriend, Anna. John takes an entry-level position at an ad agency, but things develop with Paul, a successful executive at the firm, who takes a special interest in John. Eventually they end up together in Paul's bed, and his world turns upside down.

Cast
Jesse Rosen as Jon
Johnny Ray as Paul
Jared Grey as Andy
Rachel Castillo as Maddy
Emilia Richeson as Anna
Jim Dineen as Young Male Office Assistant
Jesse Janzen as Brian
Tyler Jenich as Cole
Alan LaPolice as Rand
Bryan McGowan as Matt
Anne Reeder as Simone
Dana May Salah as Renee
Pete Scherer as Aaron
Jen Zaborowski as Bela

References

External links

2008 films
2008 LGBT-related films
American LGBT-related films
Male bisexuality in film
2000s English-language films
2000s American films